Motocade are a New Zealand Rock band formed in Auckland in 2003 by Eden Mulholland (singer/guitarist), Scott Sutherland (bass), Geordie McCallum (guitar/keyboards) and Will Mulholland (drums). In 2007 the music video for the single "My Friends" received high rotation on the New Zealand music channel C4 and Juice TV. In early 2008 the music video for the single "Soap Opera" was in rotation
on C4. Motocade's song Octopus was featured in a Home and Away episode where Myles finds out about Roman's Afghanistan secret. Their song Oldest Trick in the Book has also been used in a Home and Away episode.

In March 2007 the EP "Into the Fall" reached number 9 on the IMNZ Album Chart.

In mid-2010, the band released the song "Holy Moly", which received frequent airplay on ZM and was used as the theme song for Hamish & Andy's Reministmas Special (2010) and Hamish and Andy's Caravan of Courage – Australia vs. New Zealand (2012).

Debut album
Tightrope Highway is Motocade's debut studio album which was released on 20 April 2009. It was recorded at Roundhouse Studios and The Lab.

The group has not released any material since late 2010.

Track listing 
 Golden Light
 Flying Saucer
 Kissed in Time
 Commandeering
 She got deaf
 My Friends
 Tightrope Highway
 Oldest Trick in the Book
 Comeback Kid
 Octopus
 Jekyll And Hyde

Personnel 
 Eden Mulholland- Guitar/Vocals
 Geordie McCallum- Guitar
 Scott Sutherland- Bass
 Will Mulholland- Drums/Vocals

Discography

Studio albums

Extended plays

Singles

References

Websites
Motocade MySpace Account

Motocade